Div' dūjiņas gaisā skrēja is the title of a traditional Latvian folk song that is best known as a musical composition by Dāvids Cimze.

Lyrics

Notes on the translation 
 verse 1skrēja translates most literally as "ran", here in the sense of dashing up into the air, this is the only verse in the translation which does not repeat the verb consistently within the verse.

References

External links 
 Div’ dūjiņas gaisā skrēja score

Latvian folk songs
Year of song missing